Emamzadeh Ala Eddin (also Romanized as Emāmzādeh ‘Alā Eddīn and Emāmzādeh ‘Alā’ Eddīn) is a village in Kharaqan-e Gharbi Rural District, Central District, Avaj County, Qazvin Province, Iran. In 2006, its population was 284, in 84 families.

References 

Populated places in Avaj County